Ahto Buldas (born 17 January 1967) is an Estonian computer scientist. He is the inventor of Keyless Signature Infrastructure, Co-Founder and Chief Scientist at Guardtime and Chair of the OpenKSI foundation.

Life and education
Buldas was born in Tallinn. After graduating from high school, he was conscripted in to the Soviet Army where he spent 2 years as an artillery officer in Siberia. After being discharged, he started studies in Tallinn University of Technology, where he defended his MSc degree in 1993 and his PhD in 1999. He currently lives in Tallinn with his wife and four children.

Career
Buldas was a leading contributor to the Estonian Digital Signature Act and ID-card from 1996 to 2002, currently the only national-level public-key infrastructure (PKI) which has achieved widespread adoption by a country's population for legally binding digital signatures. He published his first timestamping related research in 1998 and has published over 30 academic papers on the subject. His experience of implementing a national level PKI led him to invent Keyless Signature Infrastructure, a digital signature/timestamping system for electronic data that uses only hash-function based cryptography. By using hash-functions as the only cryptographic primitive the complexities of key management are eliminated and the system remains secure from quantum cryptographic attacks. His invention led to the founding of keyless signature technology company Guardtime in 2006.

He is the Chair of Information Security at Tallinn University of Technology. Buldas has been a supervisor for 15 MSc dissertations and 4 PhD theses.

Awards
 2002: Young Scientist Award by the Cultural Foundation of the President of Estonia.
 2015: Order of the White Star, IV class.

References

Academic work

External links
 Ahto Buldas' personal website 
 Ahto Buldas' series of mini-lectures about cryptographic hash functions 
 Ahto Buldas' TTU lecture on keyless signatures

1967 births
Living people
Modern cryptographers
Estonian inventors
Estonian computer scientists
Estonian mathematicians
Recipients of the Order of the White Star, 4th Class
People from Tallinn
Tallinn University of Technology alumni
Academic staff of the University of Tartu
Academic staff of the Tallinn University of Technology